Andrew Cohen (born 1977) is an Australian businessman and CEO of leading primary healthcare network Healius Medical & Dental.

Early life and education
Born in Melbourne in 1977, Cohen attended high school in Melbourne, before completing consecutive bachelor's degrees in arts (Philosophy) and Commerce (Finance and Accounting) at the University of Melbourne.

Career

Cohen joined management consultancy L.E.K. Consulting as a graduate in 2002, working in the Private Equity and Corporate Mergers and Acquisitions sectors of the firm's Australian and US offices. In 2005, the firm sponsored him to undertake a full-time MBA at Cambridge University where he graduated first in his class.

Bain and Company
From 2008 to 2016, Cohen worked as a Consumer Products and Retail advisor with high-profile global management consultancy Bain & Company. In 2014 he was promoted to partner in Bain's Melbourne office.  
His experience in cross-border trade in China, and track record of business turn-arounds during his time as a partner at Bain & Company saw him recruited as a senior executive at Bellamy's Organic.

Bellamy's Organic
Cohen joined Bellamy's Organic in June 2016 as COO & Chief Strategic Officer. Six months later he was appointed acting CEO in January 2017, following departure of former CEO Laura McBain and in the wake of sharemarket unrest, significant regulatory change and a slowdown in China demand. Bellamy's had faced a share price plunge in December and January, after flagging a significant drop in sales and earnings. An investor-led revolt followed, replacing the board of directors and senior management team.

In April 2017, with the appointment of John Ho of Hong Kong-based investor Janchor Partners to the board as a non-executive Director and later to chairman, Bellamy's confirmed Cohen as its permanent chief executive.

From January 2017 to December 2019, Cohen and his team led a high profile and broad reaching transformation of the Bellamy's business. Despite continued regulatory challenges, significant strategic and operational improvements were made. These included stronger revenues, a significant improvement in margins and profitability, a successful rebrand and product upgrade, and the establishment of a strong new product pipeline and local supply-chain. In December 2019 China Mengniu Dairy, a leading global dairy player, acquired Bellamy's Australia for $1.5 billion and it was officially removed from the ASX. During the three years shareholder value was increased >3 times from a share price low of $4.14 in January 2017 to the effective offer price of $13.25 per share.

Cohen continued in the CEO and managing director role as an independent subsidiary of Mengniu Dairy, with a strong focus on growth in China and rising middle-class Asia before stepping down in September 2020 to pursue a new CEO role.

Healius Medical & Dental 
Cohen was appointed CEO in November 2020 following a $500m buy-out by Australia's largest Private Equity fund BGH Capital. Healius Medical & Dental is a leading primary healthcare community of more than 3500 healthcare professionals and employees across a growing network of 86 large scale medical centres.

References

Alumni of the University of Cambridge
Australian business executives
Living people
University of Melbourne alumni
1977 births